USS Ideal (AMc-85) was an Accentor-class coastal minesweeper acquired by the U.S. Navy for the dangerous task of removing mines from minefields laid in the water to prevent ships from passing.

Ideal, a wooden-hulled coastal minesweeper, was laid down 4 June 1941 by Warren Boat Yard, Inc., Warren, Rhode Island, launched 20 September 1941; sponsored by Miss Edith C. Alder; and placed in service at Boston, Massachusetts, 24 April 1942.

World War II service 

After shakedown out of Boston, Ideal reported to Mine Warfare School, Yorktown, Virginia, 11 May 1942. The ship served subsequently in the 8th Naval District at Burrwood, Louisiana, and in the 5th Naval District as a mine warfare training ship.

Post-war decommissioning 

She returned to Norfolk, Virginia, 26 May 1946 and decommissioned there 10 June 1946. Ideal was turned over to the Maritime Commission 28 December 1946.

References

External links 
 Dictionary of American Naval Fighting Ships
 NavSource Online: Mine Warfare Vessel Photo Archive - Ideal (AMc 85)

 

Accentor-class minesweepers
Ships built in Warren, Rhode Island
1941 ships
World War II minesweepers of the United States